Unione Calcio Sampdoria spent the 1994-95 season mired in the midfield, since its remarkable offensive play from the 1993-94 season failed to occur. Despite this, it came close to another European final, but stumbled at Arsenal following penalties in the semi finals. Following the end of the season, creative midfielders David Platt, Attilio Lombardo and Vladimir Jugović all left the club, bringing further uncertainty of the future direction of the club.

Players

Transfers

Transfers

Competitions

Serie A

League table

Results by round

Matches

Coppa Italia

Second round

Round of 16

UEFA Cup Winners' Cup

First round

Second round

Quarter-finals

Semi-final

Supercoppa Italiana

Statistics

Players statistics

Goalscorers
  Ruud Gullit 9
  Roberto Mancini 9
  David Platt 8
  Attilio Lombardo 6
  Riccardo Maspero 4

References

U.C. Sampdoria seasons
Sampdoria